"A Message to You Rudy" is a 1967 rocksteady song by Dandy Livingstone. Originally titled "Rudy a Message to You", the song later achieved broader success when, in 1979, a cover version by The Specials reached number 10 in the UK Singles Chart.

Composition and recording
Livingstone came up with the idea of the song in about 10 minutes and recorded it a day or two later in about 20 minutes at Maximum Sounds Studio on Old Kent Road with engineer Vic Keary. Livingstone has said that he "had a very bad cold" on the day of recording and so it was suggested that he record the song as a guide vocal and then go over the vocals another day. However, everybody liked what Livingstone had done, so he didn't bother going back to sing over it. Whilst recording the song, Livingstone decided he wanted a trombone to feature in the song, so about a week after the recording session, he got trombonist Rico Rodriguez to play the intro melody. At the same time, he got a tenor saxophonist called Pepsi to play the same intro riff and "alternate the solo differently".

Afterwards 
"Rudy a Message to You" did have some success commercially, selling 30,000 units. It also peaked at number 9 on Record Mirror's Top R&B Singles chart in August 1967, in which it was listed as "Rudie Take a Message".

The lyrics warn a "rudy" (rude boy) to think of his future and change his ways, otherwise he will end up in prison. However, the reception was not what was intended and it was received as glorifying the rude boy culture.

Livingstone noticed that by 1969, there were three cover versions of "Rudy a Message to You", first of which was by The Locomotive. He only found out about The Specials' version after seeing their performance on Top of the Pops, after which he made inquiries about the publishing. He found out Carlin Music was the publisher and they had been trying to find Livingstone's whereabouts. Livingstone was also contacted by Eddy Grant, who wanted to be the publisher of the song and gave him £250 in advance. However, Livingstone turned down the offer and signed with Carlin.

After the success of The Specials' version, Livingstone's version was re-released in December 1979 on Trojan Records, with the song remixed by Clem Bushay.

The Specials version

The Specials' version also features trombone by Rico Rodriguez and Dick Cuthell played on trumpet. The recording was produced by Elvis Costello.

Charts

Certifications

In popular culture
The song was featured prominently in the sci-fi film Vivarium.

References

Rocksteady
1967 singles
1979 singles
The Specials songs
1967 songs
2 Tone Records singles
Chrysalis Records singles
Song recordings produced by Elvis Costello